Alfred Struwe (April 22, 1927 – February 13, 1998) was a German actor, best known for his television role as Dr. Alexander Wittkugel in Zahn um Zahn.

Struwe was born in Marienburg, West Prussia (today Malbork in Poland), the son of a postman, and grew up there with five siblings. His first acting experience was in Hitler Youth summer camps. In 1944 he was called up first into the Reich Labour Service, then into the military. After attending officer training school in Hanover, he was sent along with other young contemporaries into battle in the final days of World War II. In 1945 he rejoined his family in Leipzig. Since his father, Gustav, was opposed to his making acting his career, he instead had to attend a police academy, until in 1948 it closed and he was also discharged. From then on, he was able to dedicate himself entirely to acting. He had already performed part-time in amateur productions and taken private acting lessons during his police training. In 1949 he joined the theater company in Greiz and subsequently was engaged in Brandenburg, Zittau, Cottbus, Karl-Marx-Stadt and Dresden.

Struwe made his first appearance before the cameras in 1954, in the DEFA co-production Leuchtfeuer. Then beginning in the 1960s, his face was often seen on both movie and television screens. Several times he played the part of the would-be assassin of Hitler, Claus Schenk Graf von Stauffenberg. In 1985 he played what would become his signature role, the eccentric dentist Dr. Alexander Wittkugel in the television series Zahn um Zahn ("A Tooth for a Tooth"). This was so successful that in response to viewer demand the 7 projected episodes were extended and in the end 21 stories of "Dr. Wittkugel's Practices" were produced.

Struwe's daughter Catharina Struwe is likewise an actress, with, for example, a longstanding engagement at the Neue Bühne in Senftenberg.

With the dissolution of the Iron Curtain, the popular actor's life became quieter. Struwe made occasional further appearances on stage and on television, but otherwise enjoyed his retirement. He died in Potsdam in 1998 after a lengthy illness caused by pneumonia and was buried in the Southwest Cemetery in Stahnsdorf.

Selected filmography

1954: Leuchtfeuer - Junger Fischer
1963: Geheimarchiv an der Elbe - Adjutant von Upitz
1963: Vanina Vanini (TV Movie) - Fürst Savelli
1966: Ohne Kampf kein Sieg (TV Mini-Series) - Claus von Stauffenberg
1968: Die Toten bleiben jung - von Klemm
1969: Krupp und Krause (TV Series) - Alfried Krupp
1969: Verdacht auf einen Toten - Scheitler
1971: KLK Calling PTZ - The Red Orchestra - Bellini
1971: Liberation III: Direction of the Main Blow - Stauffenberg
1971: Istanbul-Masche (TV Movie) - Alfred Gärtner
1972: Die Bilder des Zeugen Schattmann (TV Mini-Series) - Fritz Marcus
1973: Die Hosen des Ritters Bredow - Hauptmann Otterstädt
1973-1979: Das unsichtbare Visier (TV Series) - General Gert von Wieseneck
1974: Wolz - Leben und Verklärung eines deutschen Anarchisten - Zweiter Polizist
1974: Ulzana - Aldrigton, Bürgermeister von Tucson
1975: Fischzüge (TV Movie) - Nienhusen
1976: Im Staub der Sterne - Suko
1976-1989: Polizeiruf 110 (TV Series) - Uwe Kellerbauer / Dr. Frowein / Friedrich Bader
1977: Osvobození Prahy - von Matzmer
1978: Anton the Magician - Bankmensch
1978: Zwei Betten in der Hohen Tatra - Wolfgang Witt
1979: Bis daß der Tod euch scheidet - Jens' Schwager
1980: Archiv des Todes (TV Series) - Standartenführer Hauk
1980: Oben geblieben ist noch keiner (TV Movie) - Flugplatzleiter Behrens
1980: Wizja lokalna 1901
1980: Jesli serce masz bijace
1981: Asta, mein Engelchen
1981: Der ungebetene Gast (TV Movie) - Felix Hollerbusch
1981: Berühmte Ärzte der Charité: Der kleine Doktor (TV Movie) - Geheimrat Dr. Lehnert
1982: Dein unbekannter Bruder - Staatsrat Diestelkamp
1982: Der lange Ritt zur Schule - Erster Guter
1983: Frühstück im Bett (TV Movie) - Georg Hartmann
1983: Die lieben Luder (TV Movie, Sequel to Polizeiruf 110) - Herr Zander
1983: Verzeihung, sehen Sie Fußball? - Dr. Kobermann
1983: Automärchen - Sauerboom
1984: Mensch, Oma! (TV Mini-Series) - Redner
1984: Front ohne Gnade (TV Series) - Obersturmbannführer Maas
1984-1990: Schauspielereien: Gesucht und gefunden (TV Series)
1985-1988: Zahn um Zahn (TV Series) - Dr. Alexander Wittkugel
1987: Magnat - Wilhelm II, German Emperor
1987: Sachsens Glanz und Preußens Gloria: Gräfin Cosel (TV Movie) - Graf Jacob Heinrich von Flemming
1989: 
1991: Aerolina (TV Series) - Zirkusdirektor Bernhard
1992: Karl May (TV Mini-Series) - Lawyer Bernstein
1997: Verdammtes Glück (TV Movie) - Herr Leipold (final film role)

References

External links

  

1927 births
1998 deaths
People from Malbork
People from West Prussia
German male film actors
German male stage actors
German male television actors
Deaths from pneumonia in Germany
20th-century German male actors
Hitler Youth members
Reich Labour Service members
German Army officers of World War II